The Debao–Jingxi railway is a railway line in Baise, Guangxi, China. At its northern end, the line connects with the Tiandong–Debao railway.

History
The line opened for freight services on 18 May 2013. Passenger services were introduced on 29 January 2016.

References

Railway lines in China
Railway lines opened in 2013